Belmont Abbey, in Herefordshire, England, is a Catholic Benedictine monastery that forms part of the English Benedictine Congregation. It stands on a small hill overlooking the city of Hereford to the east, with views across to the Black Mountains in Wales to the west. The 19th century Abbey also serves as a parish church.

History 

Francis Wegg-Prosser, of nearby Belmont House, who had been received into the Catholic Church, can be called its founder. He decided to build a church on his Hereford estate in 1854. He later invited the Benedictines to reside there so that there would be a permanent Catholic presence in the area. In 1859, the Benedictines arrived and it became a priory. It was the Common Novitiate and House of Studies for the English Benedictine Congregation.  It was also a pro-cathedral for the Diocese of Newport and Menevia. The Benedictine Thomas Joseph Brown, who was its first bishop, is buried in the church. Also here, but in the Abbots' graveyard outside the east end of the church, is buried Bishop Bernard Collier, missionary in Mauritius.

Belmont was unique in England for having a monastic cathedral chapter. This was the case in mediaeval England where monks were the canons of the cathedral, such as in Canterbury, Winchester and Durham.

A move to transfer the training of monks to the individual monasteries of the English Benedictine Congregation led to Belmont being allowed to take its own novices in 1901, and become an independent house in 1917. In 1920 Belmont was raised to the rank of an Abbey by the papal bull Praeclara Gesta. In 1895, the Diocese of Newport and Menevia split and the abbey remained as the pro-cathedral for the Diocese of Newport. On 7 February 1916, the Diocese of Newport became the Archdiocese of Cardiff and it was decided to make St. David's Church in Cardiff the cathedral. On 12 March 1920, St. David's church officially became the cathedral for the archdiocese and the abbey ceased to be a pro-cathedral.

The Priory was elevated in a rank of abbey by Pope Benedict XV, that issued Papal bull Praeclara Gesta on 21 March 1920 and soon after, on 30 June 1920 the Community of St Michael's elected Prior Aelred Kindersley as their first Abbot.

The Abbey Church 

The Abbey Church is a grade II* Listed building. Its construction began in 1857 and it was consecrated on 4 September 1860. It was built to the designs of Edward Welby Pugin, son of Augustus Welby Pugin. Built in the decorated, early English style, it demonstrated the resurgent optimism of the restored Catholic faith.

The exterior is in local pink sandstone, simple and unadorned, reminiscent of many classical monastic facades of the fourteenth century. The interior is faced with warm Bath stone. The church is dominated by four elegant, steeply pointed, arches which support the central tower. Originally this was the crossing, but now the altar stands here at the centre of the Church. The whole church was expensive for its time costing £45,000.

The church is noted for the quality of its sculpture and stained glass. There are windows depicting angels with harps, cymbals and pipes. There is an angel reredos in the east end of the church and a Victorian glass window showing the archangels Michael (the abbey's patron, sword and shield in hand, trampling the dragon), Raphael and Gabriel and the nine choirs of angels as an angelic orchestra sounding of praises of God.

Under a wooden roof stands the monastic choir, where the community gathers five times a day for the Divine Office and Mass. Side altars are dedicated to the Blessed Virgin Mary, St Joseph, and a memorial altar commemorating the former pupils of the school who were killed in the Second World War. The North Transept was formerly a chantry chapel dedicated to the Welsh Saints.

St Benedict's chapel, completed in 1875, is shows the monastic founder in the central reredos.

The churchyard contains three Commonwealth war graves, of a Royal Navy chaplain and a surgeon of World War I, and a Royal Air Force officer of World War II.

Monastic life 
The monastic community follows the Rule of St Benedict under the guidance of an Abbot, centred on the Divine Office and Mass prayed daily in the Abbey Church.

Following the post-Reformation English tradition, the monks have been involved in educational and pastoral work. In 1926, Belmont Abbey School was founded. This continued to expand in the post war years. Two preparatory schools were also founded, Alderwasley and Llanarth, Monmouthshire. These in turn were closed, and the school at Belmont was itself closed in 1993. Associations for former pupils still exist.

Today the monks undertake numerous works including the pastoral care of the Catholics in Herefordshire, and South Wales. In addition the community maintains a small foundation at Pachacamac near Lima, Peru, the Monastery of the Incarnation, that in May 2018 transferred to Lurín, in the buildings of the former Cistercian nunnery.

The monks also run the retreat, guesthouse and conference centre, Hedley Lodge. A programme of educational visits is offered to schools throughout the West Midlands and Wales.

The community currently numbers 27 monks in England and Peru. In 2001, its former abbot, Mark Jabalé, was appointed Bishop of Menevia. His successor as Abbot is Paul Stonham. Current Prior is Dom Michael Evans.

In 2006 the Heritage Lottery Fund awarded Belmont Abbey a grant for their project 'Discovering Belmont Abbey', to make the Abbey Church more accessible to a wide range of people, to enlarge its educational activities and restore the fabric of the church. Work commenced in August 2008.

A police investigation resulted in Father John Kinsey being sentenced to five years at Worcester Crown Court in 2005 by Judge Andrew Geddes for a series of serious offences relating to assaults on schoolboys attending Belmont Abbey School in the mid-1980s.

List of Abbots (until 1920 – Priors)

 1859–1862: Norbert Sweeney
 1862–1873: Bede Vaughan
 1873–1901: Wilfrid Raynal
 1901–1905: Ildephonsus Cummins
 1905–1914: Clement Fowler
 1915–1934: Aelred Kindersley
 1934–1940: Romuald Leonard
 1940–1948: Aidan Williams
 1948–1953: Anselm Lightbound
 1953–1955: Alphege Gleeson
 1955–1966: Maurice Martin
 1966–1970: Robert Richardson
 1970–1986: Jerome Hodkinson
 1986–1993: Alan Rees
 1993–2000: Mark Jabalé
 2000–present: Paul Stonham

Burials
Joseph Brown (bishop)

Parish of St Michael and All Angels
The abbey is also the parish church for the Parish of St Michael and All Angels, part of the Herefordshire Catholic Deanery within the Metropolitan Archdiocese of Cardiff. Until 1859 parishioners used the chapel of St Peter & St Paul for Mass. That building is now used as the parish centre.

Gallery

References

Bibliography
 The History of Belmont Abbey by Basil Whelan, Bloomsbury Publishing Company 1959.

External links 

 Belmont Abbey
 Belmont on the website of the English Benedictine Congregation

Benedictine monasteries in England
Monasteries of the English Benedictine Congregation
Schools of the English Benedictine Congregation
Belmont
Grade II* listed buildings in Herefordshire
19th-century Christian monasteries
Belmont
19th-century Roman Catholic church buildings in the United Kingdom
Roman Catholic churches completed in 1875